Toivo Tootsen (born 17 June 1943 in Rõuge) is an Estonian journalist, writer and politician. He has been member of IX, X and XI Riigikogu.

He is a member of Estonian Centre Party. His brother was journalist and politician Ülo Tootsen and his son is filmmaker Jaan Tootsen.

References

1943 births
Living people
Estonian Centre Party politicians
Estonian journalists
Members of the Riigikogu, 1999–2003
Members of the Riigikogu, 2003–2007
Members of the Riigikogu, 2007–2011
Estonian male writers
Estonian children's writers
Estonian non-fiction writers
20th-century Estonian writers
21st-century Estonian writers
University of Tartu alumni
Tallinn University alumni
People from Rõuge Parish
Male non-fiction writers